Intaglio, the process of cutting a design into a surface, may refer to:
 Intaglio, a type of engraved gem or metal signet ring
 Intaglio (printmaking), a group of printmaking techniques, including engraving and etching
 Intaglio (rock art)
 Intaglio (burial mound), a technique for decorating North American burial mounds
 Blythe Intaglios, large Native American designs on the ground in California
 Intaglio (dentistry), the interior surface of a denture
 Intaglio (conference), an Indian business school conference
 Intaglio: A Novel in Six Stories, a novel by Roberta Fernández

See also
 Relief